Clément Colson (13 November 1853 – 24 March 1939) was a French economist. He was born in Versailles and died in Paris.

Clément Colson was honorary president of the Société d'économie politique from 1929 to 1933.

References

French civil engineers
École Polytechnique alumni
École des Ponts ParisTech alumni
Corps des ponts
Conseil d'État (France)
1853 births
1939 deaths
French economists
People from Versailles
Fellows of the Econometric Society